Vasile Dolghieru (born 15 October 1966) is a former Moldovan politician. He served as Minister of Justice from 12 February 2003 to 8 July 2004. He was appointed via a presidential decree after Ion Morei was ousted earlier that day. In July 2004, Victoria Iftodi was appointed as his successor.

References 

Living people
Place of birth missing (living people)
Moldovan Ministers of Justice
21st-century Moldovan politicians
1966 births